Ylä-Rieveli (also called Ylä-Rääveli) is a medium-sized lake in Finland. It is a lake in the Kymijoki main catchment area, located in the regions Southern Savonia and Päijänne Tavastia. It is connected with another lake, Enonvesi, by the Pirtinsalmi strait.

See also
List of lakes in Finland

References

Lakes of Finland